Sa-Nur (lit. Flame Carrier) was an Israeli settlement in the northern West Bank  under the administrative jurisdiction of Shomron Regional Council until 2005. Prior to its demolition, Sa-Nur was home to 43 families.

Unilateral disengagement

In September 2005 its 105 residents were evicted and Israel Defense Forces soldiers began dismantling Sanur as part of Israeli disengagement from Gaza. The demolition of Sa-Nur and Homesh marked the end of the central part of the disengagement plan. The only remaining structure, a synagogue, was buried.

Attempts to rebuild
Since the demolition, religious Zionist groups have attempted to return to Sa-Nur, in order to rebuild the community. On 8 May 2008, following a permitted Independence Day rally in Homesh, a group of 150 set off at night for Sa-Nur, including many former residents.

On 30 July 2015, marking the 10 year anniversary since the expulsion, 250 people, made up of 20 former families, attempted to settle Sa-Nur, before being forcibly evicted by the IDF.

In late July 2018, 200 settlers, supported by Bayit Yehudi MKs Shuli Mualem and Bezalel Smotrich, revisited the area as part of a plan to challenge the Disengagement Plan  which led to the settlement's dismantlement.

See also
 Ganim
 Homesh
 Kadim
 Yossi Dagan

References

External links
Disengagement Plan of Prime Minister Ariel Sharon - Revised

Villages depopulated during the Arab–Israeli conflict
Former Israeli settlements in the West Bank
Shomron Regional Council
Israeli disengagement from Gaza